Marine Isotope Stage 13 or MIS 13 is a Marine isotope stage in the geologic temperature record, in Britain covering the Cromerian interglacial period between ~524,000 and 474,000 years ago. It is split into three substages, MIS 13a MIS 13b, and MIS 13c. Some records indicate that MIS 13a was an unstable warm peak with a cold split in the middle at MIS 13.12 - separating warm MIS 13.11 and 13.13. This interglacial follows the relatively warm glacial period associated with Marine Isotope Stage 14, and is followed by the relatively cold glacial period associated with MIS 12.

Sites 

Britain

High Lodge, Suffolk

Waverley Wood, Warwickshire

Happisburgh 1, Norfolk

Boxgrove, West Sussex

Ecology

Flora 

Early domination of birch, pine, and spruce. Mixed-oak forests follow (predominantly Alder, Oak, Hornbeam, and Hazel).

Fauna 

Mammals

References

 MIS 13
Glaciology
Paleoclimatology
Paleogeography
Paleoceanography
Interglacials